Blera shirakii is a species of hoverfly in the family Syrphidae.

Distribution
Japan.

References

Diptera of Asia
Eristalinae
Insects described in 1991